Ray Baverstock (born 3 December 1963) is a former professional football midfielder.

Baverstock began his career as an apprentice with Swindon Town, turning professional in December 1981. He made his debut on 4 September 1982 as Swindon lost 2–1 away to Blackpool. He played seventeen times that season, but was released in May 1983 and joined Cheltenham Town.

He played over 250 games for Cheltenham and had spells with Gloucester City and Worcester City before joining Bath City in July 1992. He played the first two games of the following season, but left in August 1992 to join Moreton Town after disagreements over his wages with Bath.

He went on to play for Gloucester City, Trowbridge Town, Forest Green Rovers and Cirencester Town, before becoming manager of Cirencester Town and then Devizes Town from August 2002. He left Devizes to take over as manager of Swindon Supermarine in November 2002, and guided them to safety from relegation at the end of the season, albeit on the final day. He resigned as manager in October 2003 due his increased business commitments, but was reappointed just twelve days later. He resigned again in January 2004.

References

1963 births
Living people
English footballers
Swindon Town F.C. players
Cheltenham Town F.C. players
Gloucester City A.F.C. players
Worcester City F.C. players
Bath City F.C. players
Moreton Town F.C. players
Trowbridge Town F.C. players
Forest Green Rovers F.C. players
Cirencester Town F.C. players
Swindon Supermarine F.C. players
National League (English football) players
English football managers
Cirencester Town F.C. managers
Devizes Town F.C. managers
Swindon Supermarine F.C. managers
Association football defenders